Events in the year 1973 in Cyprus.

Incumbents 

 President: Makarios III
 President of the Parliament: Glafcos Clerides

Events 

 18 February – Presidential elections were scheduled to be held but, as incumbent President Makarios III was the only candidate, the elections were not held and Makarios III was automatically declared the winner. A separate election for the vice president also took place. Rauf Denktaş stood unopposed and was elected.

Deaths

References 

 
1970s in Cyprus
Years of the 21st century in Cyprus
Cyprus
Cyprus
Cyprus